At least four vessels of the Royal Navy have borne the name HMS Leveret.

, was a  launched in 1806 and wrecked the next year.
,  was a  launched in 1808 and sold in 1822.
, was another Cherokee-class brig-sloop launched in 1825 and sold in 1843.
, was an  gunboat launched in 1856 and broken up in 1867.

References

Royal Navy ship names